The London Fog was a 1960s nightclub located on the Sunset Strip in what was then unincorporated Los Angeles County, California (now in the city of West Hollywood). It is most notable for being the venue where The Doors had their first regular gigs for several months in early 1966 before becoming the house band at the nearby Whisky a Go Go.

History
The London Fog was located west of the Whisky a Go Go, a few doors down, at 8919 Sunset Blvd.

In the years after its closure, much confusion has arisen as to what establishments occupied the space of the Fog after it closed.  Much of this confusion was due to a counterfeit concert poster depicting the incorrect address.

Both Duke's Coffee Shop and Sneeky Pete's, a former nightclub featuring music, claimed to have replaced the London Fog, but this is not true.  They both were in the location that formerly housed "Unicorn Books", a beatnik coffee house directly west of the Whisky a Go Go.  In 1966, from west to east, between Hilldale Avenue and North Clark Street, the businesses on that block were The Hamburger Hamlet, Cavalier, The London Fog, The Galaxy, The Galaxy Overflow, Sneeky Pete's and the Whisky a Go Go.

Today the location is occupied by a barber shop.

In popular culture
In Oliver Stone's 1991 film The Doors, the scenes depicting the London Fog were shot at the location that became the Viper Room in 1993. It is located one block east on the opposite side of the street.

In the Tarantino Universe, London Fog is still open in 1969, as mentioned by actor/director Sam Wanamaker (played by Nicholas Hammond) in the film Once Upon a Time… in Hollywood.

References

External links

 "The Doors' Story" by Digby Diehl, published in Eye Magazine

Defunct nightclubs in California
Sunset Boulevard (Los Angeles)
Landmarks in Los Angeles
Nightclubs in Los Angeles County, California
Music venues in Los Angeles
Former music venues in California
Buildings and structures in West Hollywood, California